CURE International is a Christian nonprofit organization based in Grand Rapids, Michigan. CURE's efforts are focused on providing medical care to children suffering primarily from orthopedic and neurological conditions.  The organization's stated mission is "healing the sick and proclaiming the kingdom of God." The organization operates hospitals in Ethiopia, Kenya, Malawi, Niger, the Philippines, Uganda, Zambia and Zimbabwe. CURE also operates a pediatric specialty training program called CURE Neuro helping children with hydrocephalus and spina bifida survive and thrive through global partnerships. Since its inception, CURE Neuro has trained 41 surgeons from 23 low- and middle-income countries.

History
The organization was founded in 1996 in central Pennsylvania, near Harrisburg, by Dr. C. Scott Harrison and his wife, Sally. Ten years earlier, Harrison had traveled to Malawi, Africa to perform spine surgery and teach higher level orthopedic surgery skills to local surgeons. In the years following, Harrison and his wife made many trips back, discovering a need for children with orthopedic disabilities. When his tenure as CEO and President of Kirschner Medical was over, Harrison created the Crippled Children's United Rehabilitation Effort (CCURE or C²URE, later CURE), hoping to meet that need. CURE's first hospital opened in 1998 in Kenya which was the first orthopedic pediatric teaching hospital in Africa for children with disabilities. Today, CURE is the largest provider of pediatric surgical care in the developing world. Harrison stepped down as President in 2012.

In 2006, CURE acquired Oasis Hospital in Al Ain, United Arab Emirates. The hospital was established in 1960 by the American missionary couple Drs. Pat and Marian Kennedy, who were a part of the missionary organization TEAM (the Evangelical Alliance Mission). The hospital has a focus on maternal health and is the oldest hospital in Al Ain. The hospital became the first non-government hospital in the emirate of Abu Dhabi to receive the Joint Commission International Accreditation in 2007 and was re-accredited in 2010 and 2013.

CURE established a program to treat infant clubfoot called CURE Clubfoot Worldwide, in 2006. This program then began to expand beyond CURE hospitals and partnered with other national hospitals and established clinics in countries that CURE International did not have a presence in, like Rwanda, Mozambique and India. In 2019, CURE Clubfoot separated from CURE as a new independent NGO, and was renamed Hope Walks.

CURE created a separate division for management of international hospitals, called CURE Healthcare Management Services, in the late 2000s. Capabilities ranged from initial strategic analysis of a project to construction, staffing, outfitting and management. Clients included hospitals not owned by CURE International, in countries such as China, Indonesia and Angola. In 2012 the division became a separate company, renamed CURE Management Services, or CMS, and continued to operate for a few years. The company is no longer active.

On July 1, 2019 CURE acquired International Aid Inc., which became a distinct but wholly owned subsidiary of CURE International. Both organizations merged resources, teams, and offices into a shared West Michigan presence
at a warehouse building in Spring Lake, Michigan, with the main office located in Grand Rapids, MI.

Hospitals

Current hospitals

Ethiopia: The CURE Ethiopia Children's Hospital, established in 2008, is a pediatric orthopedic teaching hospital in Addis Ababa. It provides training in pediatric and advanced orthopedic techniques and has a dual focus on pediatric orthopedics and pediatric plastic reconstruction, such as cleft lip, clubfoot, and limb deformities.

Kenya: The first CURE hospital opened in 1998 in Kijabe. The AIC-CURE International Children's Hospital is a 30-bed hospital that serves approximately 8,000 children per year, also operating mobile clinics to remote regions. The orthopedic training program has been certified by the College of Surgeons of East, Central and Southern Africa, where surgeons spend five years training at the hospital and then work at another CURE hospital. CURE Clubfoot, a non-surgical treatment for the correction of clubfoot in young children, is hosted in this hospital.

Malawi: Established in 2002 with a donation from the Beit Trust, the Beit CURE International Hospital in Blantyre has 66 beds and has expertise in total hip and knee replacement surgery. The hospital also provides physiotherapy and chiropractic services, orthopedic training, mobile clinics and a partnership with Smile Train.

Niger: The CURE Hôpital des Enfants au Niger opened in Niamey in the summer of 2010, offering specialty surgical care and training programs for doctors and nurses. In April 2016, the Satmed eHealth platform was deployed to the Niamey CURE hospital to provide communication between staff and national and international doctors to receive medical counselling, remote diagnosis of patients by experts across the world, online training for doctors and nurses to improve their knowledge, and easy access to the internet, via satellite.

Uganda: Specializing in treating neurosurgical needs, the CURE Children's Hospital of Uganda opened in 2000 and has been recognized as a global leader in treatment of hydrocephalus. The hospital, located in Mbale, also treats children with neural tube defects, spina bifida, epilepsy, and brain tumors. The training program brings in surgeons from many countries, including Bangladesh, the U.S., and Ghana.

Zambia: The Beit CURE International Hospital of Zambia was established in 2004 in Lusaka when CURE signed an agreement with the Zambian Ministry of Health to operate a pediatric teaching hospital, specializing in treatment and care of children living with disabilities. The Beit Trust, a UK-based charity, donated $1.5 million to support construction of the hospital as a centennial gift to the people of Zambia. The hospital partners with Smile Train and has a hip replacement program.

Tebow CURE Hospital

CURE and the Tebow Foundation announced plans to build a children's hospital in the fall of 2011 in the Philippines, the country where ESPN broadcaster Tim Tebow was born. The Tebow CURE Hospital in Davao City, on the island of Mindanao, will hold 30 beds and will specialize in orthopedics. Construction began in January 2012 and was completed in late 2014, with a grand opening in May 2015.

Former hospitals
Afghanistan: CURE accepted the invitation from Afghan Ministry of Public Health to take over a hospital located in Kabul in January, 2005. The hospital offers care for 8,000 patients each year and training programs for doctors and nurses in obstetrics and gynecology, pathology, orthopedic surgery, plastic surgery and general practice. In the fall of 2006, CURE partnered with Smile Train to develop a cleft lip and cleft palate surgical training program. In July 2019, CURE International entered into an agreement that transitioned the Afghanistan hospital located in Kabul over to Be Team International.

On 24 April 2014, three CURE physicians were killed by an Afghan security guard, among them one American, Dr. Jerry Umanos, a pediatrician. Dr. Umanos' wife, who forgave the gunman, commented on her husband's "love for the Afghan people" and "desire to be the hands and feet of Christ".

United Arab Emirates: The Kanad Hospital (formerly CURE Oasis Hospital), located in Al Ain, was established in 1960 to bring American medical care to the UAE. The hospital delivers 3,500 babies and treats over 122,000 patients annually. CURE acquired the hospital in 2006. CURE International and True Sojourners entered into an agreement that transitioned the Kanad Hospital in Al Ain, United Arab Emirates between the parties, effective October 1, 2020.

Closed hospitals
Dominican Republic: The Centro de Ortopedia y Especialidades CURE International, established in 2003, was located in Santo Domingo. It served approximately 700 outpatients per month. The hospital also sent surgical teams into Haiti and responded to the 2010 Haiti earthquake by sending in one of the first surgical teams into that country. The hospital ceased doing surgical operations in 2018.

Honduras: In 2013, the CURE Internacional Hospital de Ortopedia Pediátrica, located in San Pedro Sula, closed due to increasing insecurity in the country, and a lack of funding from the government. During its four years of operation, approximately 20,000 children were treated with orthopedic corrections. CURE continues to work in the country through its specialty hydrocephalus program.

Specialty programs

Current Programs
CURE Neuro (formerly CURE Hydrocephalus): Launched in 2011, the program provides surgeons the training and equipment to combat the condition. Surgeons are trained in multiple forms of hydrocephalus treatment, including a “shuntless” procedure known as the Warf procedure, or ETV/CPC, where they identify the blockage in the brain and create a new path through which the accumulating fluid can drain naturally. With the surgery taking as little as 45 minutes, CURE claims the results are permanent and often much more stable than implanting a shunt.

On August 2, 2011, three representatives of CURE Hydrocephalus testified in front of the U. S. House of Representatives Foreign Affairs Subcommittee on Africa, Global Health, and Human Rights. Dr. Benjamin Warf, former medical director of CURE Uganda, Dr. Steven Schiff, who conducted research at CURE Uganda, and Jim Cohick, Senior Vice President of Specialty Programs at CURE International, spoke on the issue.

Former Programs
CURE Clubfoot: Clubfoot, a congenital deformity making walking difficult or impossible, can be corrected, using the surgery-free Ponseti Method for $250. CURE Clubfoot's goal is to eradicate clubfoot in the developing world, with over 220,000 children born each year with the deformity. Through partnerships with other international NGOs, the donor community and in-country partners, CURE has enrolled over 100,000 children in 18 countries with 291 clinics. As of 2019, the CURE Clubfoot program was turned into an independent company and renamed Hope Walks.

CURE Egypt: Through partnerships with Good Shepherd and Angelo American hospitals in Cairo, patients with disabilities who could not afford care had their surgery costs subsidized by CURE International, and then performed at one of the hospitals. Established in 2006, originally CURE had plans to build a hospital in Cairo but the hospital was never constructed. The program ended in 2016.

References

External links
Cure International official site
U.S. PVO Registry - United States private voluntary organizations entry
Bringing Hope and Healing to Disabled Children - Synergos
CURE Partners with Tim Tebow - PR Newswire
Oasis Hospital in UAE

Christian charities based in the United States
Christian organizations established in 1996
Charities based in Michigan
Health charities in the United States
Medical and health organizations based in Michigan